Jamaica competed at the 1956 Summer Olympics in Melbourne, Australia.

Results by event

Athletics
Men

References
Official Olympic Reports

Nations at the 1956 Summer Olympics
1956